Moresby Under the Blitz is a short 1942 Australian documentary made for propaganda purposes.

References

External links
Moresby Under the Blitz at IMDb
Full copy of film
Morseby Under the Blitz at Oz Movies

Australian World War II propaganda films
1940s Australian films